Final league standings for the 1930-31 St. Louis Soccer League.

League standings

Top Goal Scorers

External links
St. Louis Soccer Leagues (RSSSF)
The Year in American Soccer - 1931

1930-31
1930–31 domestic association football leagues
1930–31 in American soccer
St Louis
St Louis